Robert French (fl. 1377–1386) of Totnes, Devon was an English politician.

He was a Member (MP) of the Parliament of England for Totnes in January 1377, November 1384, 1385 and 1386. He married Anne Winard, daughter and heiress of Robert Winard of Sharpham in the parish of Ashprington in Devon.

References

Year of birth missing
Year of death missing
14th-century births
15th-century deaths
English MPs January 1377
Members of the Parliament of England (pre-1707) for Totnes
English MPs November 1384
English MPs 1385
English MPs 1386